was a city located in Ehime Prefecture, Japan. The city was founded on November 1, 1954.

As of 2003, the city had an estimated population of 37,612 and the density of 543.13 persons per km². The total area was 69.25 km².

On April 1, 2004, Kawanoe, along with the city of Iyomishima, the town of Doi, and the village of Shingū (both from Uma District), was merged to create the city of Shikokuchūō.

Dissolved municipalities of Ehime Prefecture
Shikokuchūō